Virginia Ruano Pascual and Paola Suárez were the defending champions, but Ruano Pascual did not compete this year. Suárez teamed up with Fabiola Zuluaga and lost in semifinals to Tina Križan and Tatiana Perebiynis.

Katarina Srebotnik and Åsa Svensson won the title by defeating Tina Križan and Tatiana Perebiynis 6–2, 6–1 in the final.

Seeds

Draw

Draw

References
 Official results archive (ITF)
 Official results archive (WTA)

Copa Colsanitas - Doubles
2003 Doubles